Nesopupa baldwini is a species of very small air-breathing land snail, a terrestrial pulmonate gastropod mollusks in the family Vertiginidae the whorl snails. This species is endemic to Hawaii in the USA.

References

Vertiginidae
Gastropods described in 1904
Endemic fauna of the United States
Molluscs of Hawaii
Taxa named by César Marie Félix Ancey
Taxonomy articles created by Polbot